The Banggai jungle flycatcher (Cyornis pelingensis) is a species of passerine bird in the Old World flycatcher family Muscicapidae.
It is endemic to Peleng in Indonesia where its natural habitat is subtropical or tropical moist lowland forests.

References

Banggai jungle flycatcher
Birds of Sulawesi
Banggai jungle flycatcher